Nandrin is a municipality of Wallonia located in the province of Liège, Belgium. 

On January 1, 2006, Nandrin had a total population of 5,539. The total area is 35.90 km² which gives a population density of 154 inhabitants per km².

The municipality consists of the following districts: Nandrin, Saint-Séverin-en-Condroz, Villers-le-Temple, and Yernée-Fraineux.

Notable residents
Ovide Musin (1854–1929), violinist and composer, born in Nandrin

See also
 List of protected heritage sites in Nandrin

References

External links
 

Municipalities of Liège Province